Vestibular papillomatosis (VP) are normal small bumps in the genital area of females. They appear in multiple numbers, are rounded and are not painful, itchy or uncomfortable. They are analogous to pearly penile papules, which occur in males.

They are not infectious and are not due to HPV. Diagnosis is by visualization. The bumps are less yellow and more pinkish when compared to Fordyce spots. They should not be mistaken for genital warts. No treatment is required.

They are common in pregnancy. Historically they were sometimes incorrectly called "microwarts".

References 

Conditions of the mucous membranes